"Une lettre de J. M. G. Le Clezio"is an essay written by French Nobel laureate J. M. G. Le Clézio.

Revue des Deux Mondes
Une lettre de J. M. G. Le Clezio" (2006-05-30) was first published by Revue des Deux Mondes, Paris ( issue no.7) on pages 75–77. There were 3 pages

Subject
The letter Le Clézio wrote in response to a letter by Michel Crépu referring to Finnegans Wake has the subject line :"VOYAGER, MEDITER" in French which would translate into English as being "to travel and to carefully consider" or "meditate".

Publication history
REVUE DES DEUX MONDES, no. 7/8, (2006): 75–77;British Library Serials:BL Shelfmark:	7898.300000

References

2006 essays
Essays by J. M. G. Le Clézio
Works originally published in Revue des deux Mondes
Works by J. M. G. Le Clézio